Muliufi Salanoa (born 16 August 1980 in Vaivase) is a Samoan rugby union prop. He is a member of the Samoa national rugby union team and participated with the squad at the 2007 Rugby World Cup.

References

1980 births
Living people
Rugby union props
Samoan rugby union players
Samoa international rugby union players